FYJ may refer to:

Fuyuan Dongji Airport, in Heilongjiang, China
Frankford Yellow Jackets, an American football team